The Alliance for Europe of the Nations was a pan-European political party that gathered conservative and national-conservative political parties from across the continent.

History
The AEN was founded in 2002, designed to complement the existing Union for Europe of the Nations group in the European Parliament.  Moves towards establishing standardised funding block grants for European political parties were at this point well afoot, and the parties affiliated with UEN required a corresponding organisation to take advantage of them.

Almost immediately upon its founding, the AEN began to decline in terms of membership and influence.  At its first meeting, participants included the Czech Civic Democratic Party, Portuguese CDS-PP, Israeli Likud, Irish Fianna Fáil, Italian National Alliance and the Greek Popular Orthodox Rally, all of which later left the organisation.

The AEN had a broadly national-conservative political line, but many members were uncomfortable with this. There was a strong movement for the centrist Fianna Fáil to leave AEN and join the European Liberal Democrat and Reform Party, which it did on 17 April 2009. Also, National Alliance, which despite its post-fascist background was a moderate national-conservative party strongly promoting European integration, grew uncomfortable with AEN and left it for the European People's Party by merging with Forza Italia to form The People of Freedom party on 27 March 2009.

MEPs elected from its member-parties were expected to sit in the affiliated Union for Europe of the Nations (UEN) group in the European Parliament, but UEN collapsed in 2009 following the 2009 European Parliament elections, and MEPs from AEN member parties were scattered across the European Conservatives and Reformists and Europe of Freedom and Democracy groups, and their respective European-level parties, the Alliance of European Conservatives and Reformists and Movement for a Europe of Liberties and Democracy.

After those realignments, there were too few AEN member parties left to retain its EU-funded status as a political party at European level. The AEN's 2009 grant was rescinded.

Funding
The grants from the European Parliament to AEN from 2004-2010 were as follows:

Member parties

References

Pan-European political parties
Organisations based in Luxembourg City
Eurosceptic parties
2002 establishments in the European Union
2009 disestablishments in the European Union
Political parties established in 2002
Political parties disestablished in 2009